North Carolina's 13th House district is one of 120 districts in the North Carolina House of Representatives. It has been represented by Republican Celeste Cairns since 2023.

Geography
Since 2023, the district has included all of Carteret County, as well as part of Craven County. The district overlaps with the 1st and 2nd Senate districts.

District officeholders since 1995

Election results

2022

2020

2018

2016

2014

2012

2010

2008

2006

2004

2002

2000

References

North Carolina House districts
Carteret County, North Carolina
Craven County, North Carolina